Silvanerpeton is an extinct genus of early reptiliomorph found by Stan Wood in the East Kirkton Quarry of West Lothian, Scotland, in a sequence from the Brigantian substage of the Viséan (Lower Carboniferous). The find is important, as the quarry represents terrestrial deposits from Romer's gap, a period poor in fossils where the higher groups "labyrinthodonts" evolved. 

The type species Silvanerpeton miripedes was named by Jennifer A. Clack in 1993/1994. The generic name is derived from Silvanus, the Roman god of woods. The specific name means "wondrous feet" in Latin. The holotype is specimen UMZC T1317, a skeleton with skull and skin impressions. 

Based on a remarkably well preserved humerus and other traits, the animal is believed to have been a relatively advanced reptiliomorph, close to the origin of amniotes.

In life Silvanerpeton was about 40 cm (1 ft) long. Some paleontologists think it was semi-aquatic as an adult, others believe only young individuals of Silvanerpeton were aquatic and the adults were fully terrestrial.

References

Carboniferous tetrapods of Europe
Fossil taxa described in 1994
Viséan genera